Raúl Ebers Mera Pozzi (born 14 June 1936) is a Uruguayan basketball player who won the bronze medal with the men's national team at the 1956 Summer Olympics in Melbourne, Australia. Four years later he once again competed in the Olympics for his native country.

External links

1936 births
Living people
Basketball players at the 1956 Summer Olympics
Basketball players at the 1960 Summer Olympics
Olympic basketball players of Uruguay
Olympic bronze medalists for Uruguay
Uruguayan men's basketball players
1959 FIBA World Championship players
Uruguayan people of Spanish descent
Sportspeople from Montevideo
Olympic medalists in basketball
Medalists at the 1956 Summer Olympics
1954 FIBA World Championship players